Mohammad Tala Mazloumi (born in Behbahan, Khuzestan province) is a principlist representative of Behbahan and Aghajari in the Islamic Consultative Assembly (the Parliament of Iran) who was elected at the 11th Majles elections on 21 February 2020 and captured about 18,000 votes.

Mohammad Tala Mazloumi is considered as one of the 18 representatives of Khuzestan provinces at the current "Islamic Consultative Assembly" (11th parliament).

See also
 List of Iran's parliament representatives (11th term)
 Ebrahim Matinian

References

Members of the 11th Islamic Consultative Assembly
Year of birth missing (living people)
Living people